The 1930 Middle Tennessee State Teachers football team represented the Middle Tennessee State Teachers College (now known as Middle Tennessee State University) as an independent during the 1930 college football season. Led by fifth-year head coach Frank Faulkinberry, Middle Tennessee State Teachers compiled a record of 5–5–1. The team's captain was Julian Crocker.

Schedule

References

Middle Tennessee State Teachers
Middle Tennessee Blue Raiders football seasons
Middle Tennessee State Teachers football